Silvermaster may refer to:

Helen Silvermaster (1899–1991), Soviet spy
Nathan Gregory Silvermaster (1898–1964), Soviet Spy
FBI Silvermaster File, 162 volume FBI archive on the Silvermaster spy group